Kieran Raymond White (July 27, 1948 - August 9, 1995, Oregon, United States) was an English baritone rock vocalist and guitarist. He sang and played in the blues-rock band Steamhammer, formed in 1968. Their debut album, Steamhammer. was released in 1969, on which White co-wrote many of the songs and played harmonica.

White left Steamhammer in 1971 and recorded a solo album, Open Door (released in 1975). He also worked for Gull Records as a staff songwriter, and later sang for the jazz-rock band Nucleus. After this period, he emigrated to the United States and became a truck driver, settling in Oregon. He died in 1995 from cancer.

References

1948 births
1995 deaths
English blues guitarists
English male guitarists
English rock guitarists
English blues singers
English rock singers
English expatriates in the United States
British harmonica players
Blues rock musicians
Steamhammer (band) members
Deaths from cancer in Oregon
Nucleus (band) members